Gallier is a surname that may refer to:

Billy Gallier (1932–2011), English association football player
Howard Gallier (1872–1955), English association football player
James Gallier (1798–1866), architect, born Gallagher in Ireland and changed name to Gallier when moving to New Orleans
James Gallier, Jr. (1827–1868), architect, son of James
Jean Gallier (b. 1949), French and American logician

See also
Gallagher (surname)
Galler, another similar surname
Gallier Hall, the former New Orleans city hall, built by James Gallier
Gallier House, the New Orleans home of James Gallier, Jr.
Irena Gallier, fictional protagonist of Cat People (1982 film)
TSV Großbardorf, a German association football club nicknamed Gallier (the German word for Gauls)